Reg McGuire (born 24 August 1959) is an English footballer, who played as a forward in the Football League for Tranmere Rovers.

References

Tranmere Rovers F.C. players
Cammell Laird 1907 F.C. players
Bangor City F.C. players
English Football League players
Association football forwards
1959 births
Living people
English footballers
People from Birkenhead